Barbara Niedernhuber (nicknamed Babsi, born 6 June 1974 in Berchtesgaden) is a German luger who competed from 1994 to 2006. She won two silver medals in the women's singles event at the Winter Olympics (1998 (she was beaten by 2 thousandths of a second by her teammate, Silke Kraushaar), 2002). A favorite to make the 2006 Winter Olympics, she was upset at the national championships by Tatjana Hüfner in late 2005.

Niedernhuber also won seven medals at the FIL World Luge Championships with one gold (Mixed team: 2004), four silvers (Women's singles: 1999, 2000, 2004, 2005), and two bronzes (Women's singles: 2001, 2003). She also won three bronze medals in the women's singles event at the FIL European Luge Championships (2000, 2002, 2006).

Niedernhuber won the overall Luge World Cup title in women's singles in 2004–5.

Niedernhuber retired abruptly prior to the start of the 2006-07 World Cup season to a bacterial infection in her ankle joint that developed after surgery during the summer of 2006.

Cultural references
 In The Simpsons episode "The Bart of War", Milhouse mentions he feels "like luge silver medalist Barbara Niedernhuber" while riding Flanders' video cart.

References
  - retrieved June 12, 2007 .

External links
 

1974 births
Living people
People from Berchtesgaden
Sportspeople from Upper Bavaria
German female lugers
Lugers at the 1998 Winter Olympics
Lugers at the 2002 Winter Olympics
Olympic silver medalists for Germany
Olympic lugers of Germany
Olympic medalists in luge
Medalists at the 2002 Winter Olympics
Medalists at the 1998 Winter Olympics